Bowling Green Plateau is a small but prominent ice-covered plateau at the north side of the Brown Hills in the Cook Mountains in Antarctica  It was named by the Victoria University of Wellington Antarctic Expedition (VUWAE) (1962–63); Professor Charles C. Rich, geologist and deputy leader of the VUWAE, was affiliated with Bowling Green State University of Ohio. It is associated with the Bowling Green Col.

See also
Gatson Ridge

References

 

Plateaus of Oates Land
Bowling Green State University